WYTV (channel 33) is a television station in Youngstown, Ohio, United States, affiliated with ABC and MyNetworkTV. It is owned by Vaughan Media, which maintains joint sales and shared services agreements (JSA/SSA) with Nexstar Media Group, owner of CBS affiliate WKBN-TV (channel 27) and low-power Fox affiliate WYFX-LD (channel 19), for the provision of certain services. The three stations share studios on Sunset Boulevard in Youngstown's Pleasant Grove neighborhood, where WYTV's transmitter is also located.

History
The station originated as WKST-TV (UHF analog channel 45) as the television partner to WKST radio, and was licensed to New Castle, Pennsylvania, on April 4, 1953.

Besides serving New Castle, it was the default ABC affiliate in Youngstown, making Youngstown at the time one of the smallest markets to have full-time affiliates of all three networks (following the demise of the DuMont Television Network), as ABC would be relegated to secondary status in many markets until the 1970s. It also served the northern and western portions of the Pittsburgh market with poor signals from WENS (frequency now occupied by WINP-TV). After WENS signed off due to financial problems (some assets would be used to launch what eventually became WPNT), WKST-TV was the only full-time ABC affiliate in Western Pennsylvania until September 1958 when WTAE-TV went live; future sister station WJET-TV would sign on in Erie, Pennsylvania, in 1966.

After being dark for a period of time, 
WKST-TV moved to the stronger channel 33 in 1959, improving its over-the-air signal in the process. After moving channels, WYTV was replaced on channel 45 by independent station WXTV, which signed on in November 1960; WXTV would be forced off the air on February 28, 1962, and never resumed broadcasting, the FCC denied their license application in April 1964 after an extensive investigation into it and co-owned WWIZ in Lorain, Ohio. In 1973, channel 45 was re-allocated to nearby Alliance, Ohio, as an educational channel and became WNEO. In September 1963, WKST-TV's city of license designation was moved to Youngstown and the call letters were changed to WYTV (it carried the  suffix from 1983 to 1998).

Along with WTAE-TV and to a lesser extent WTVN/WSYX in Columbus, WYTV at times has also served as the default ABC affiliate to the Wheeling, West Virginia–Steubenville, Ohio, market, which has only two commercial stations, WTOV-TV and WTRF-TV (the latter being a sister station to WYTV during the 1990s and again since 2017). Although the area finally got a full-time ABC affiliate in 2008 when WTRF-TV launched one on its third digital subchannel, WYTV remains on cable in parts of the market.

The station was Youngstown's first Fox network affiliate from 1994 to 1998. Youngstown did not have a full-time Fox affiliate for the network's first decade, so WYTV joined the network as a secondary affiliate in part due to the network's acquisition of the rights to NFL football. As Fox had rights to the National Football Conference, the rights weren't as much for the Cleveland Browns and Pittsburgh Steelers since both teams were in the American Football Conference and shared the Youngstown television market since NBC at the time retained AFC rights and their games remained on WFMJ-TV. (In the Browns case, no games would air at all for three years during this time.) Rather, the secondary Fox affiliation was for the NFC's San Francisco 49ers, who were and still are today owned by the locally-based DeBartolo-York family and won Super Bowl XXIX during this time.

WYTV was owned by a consortium of local investors until 1965, when a group headed by Adam Young Inc. (whose namesake founder, along with his son Vincent, would start Young Broadcasting 21 years later) purchased the station. A company known as Aurovideo, Inc., which was owned by the Adams-Russell Company, acquired WYTV on November 13, 1970. On June 22, 1983, Benedek Broadcasting purchased 50% of the station with investor Robert L. Dudley, and formed the Youngstown Broadcasting Company as licensee. Benedek purchased the remaining stake on November 25, 1985, and remained the station's owner until the company's bankruptcy filing in 2002. Instead of being purchased by Gray Television, WYTV was bought by Chelsey Television, LLC and was managed by Barrington Broadcasting. The station has applied to increase its digital signal to one megawatt at the end of the transition.

On February 6, 2007, Chelsey Television filed an application with the FCC to sell WYTV to Parkin Broadcasting of California, which then leased out the station to WKBN/WYFX owner New Vision Television under a shared services agreement—essentially a local marketing agreement under different legal terms. At the time, some critics wondered if the shared services agreement was legal, since the Youngstown market only has four full-power television stations (WFMJ, WKBN, WYTV, and PBS member station WNEO)—not enough to legally permit a duopoly under FCC rules. New Vision and Parkin share an office building in Los Angeles and have a "cozy relationship", leading to speculation that Parkin is simply a shell corporation that enables New Vision to circumvent FCC ownership rules. This is not unlike what Sinclair Broadcast Group does with Cunningham Broadcasting, which is a shell corporation of Sinclair. Nonetheless, the FCC approved the shared services agreement on July 30, 2007. WYTV then moved from its 3800 Shady Run Road studios over to the WKBN/WYFX facilities in Boardman Township.

The 24-hour local weather channel had also been offered on the digital tier of Time Warner Cable at one point. Originally called "Weather on the 3s", the channel shows continuous weather updates through WYTV's relationship with WeatherBug. It was redesigned on February 24, 2009, when WKBN and WYFX had their on-air look redesigned and "Weather on the 3s" was made to match those two station's on-air look. It was renamed "My Valley Weather" to coincide with the launch of the combined weather website for WYTV and WKBN. This station is currently the only commercial outlet in the area with three digital subchannels. Along with sister station WKBN, WYTV plans on having two subchannels broadcasting in high-definition with MyYTV broadcasting in HD. The future of the "My Valley Weather" subchannel was uncertain due to MyYTV proposing an upgrade to HD. As of February 2012, MyYTV is still in standard definition, however, and its HD feed is currently available only on cable. On July 1, 2013, WYTV added Bounce TV to 33.3, displacing the MyValley Weather channel.

On May 7, 2012, LIN TV Corporation announced that it will acquire the New Vision Television station group for $330.4 million and the assumption of $12 million in debt. Along with the outright ownership of WKBN-TV, the agreement includes the acquisition of New Vision's shared services agreement with PBC Broadcasting (who is also transferring the licenses of the PBC-owned stations to Vaughan Media), giving LIN operational control of WYTV. LIN and Vaughan also entered into a joint sales agreement for WYTV. On October 2, the FCC approved the proposed sale to LIN TV. The transaction was closed on October 12, 2012.

On March 21, 2014, Media General announced that it would purchase LIN Media and its stations, including WKBN-TV, WYFX-LD, and the SSA and JSA with WYTV, in a $1.6 billion merger. The FCC approved the deal on December 12, 2014, but a condition of the deal requires Media General to end the JSA between WKBN-TV and WYTV within two years due to tighter regulations on such deals. The merger was completed on December 19.

In 2017, WKBN sold its spectrum for $34 million as part of the FCC's spectrum reallocation program and will move its broadcasting to WYTV's frequency. WKBN-TV moved to WYTV's frequency on April 23, 2018. To make room for WKBN-TV, Bounce TV moved from 33.3 to WYFX's 19.4 while Ion Television moved from 27.3 to WYFX 19.3.

MyYTV
On June 13, 2006, WYTV announced that it would launch a new second digital subchannel in September 2006 featuring MyNetworkTV. The move made that station the last full-power channel to launch a secondary subchannel in Youngstown. The official launch occurred September 5 while soon after on September 18  WB outlet "WBCB" (controlled and operated by NBC affiliate WFMJ-TV) became part of The CW television network. The digital subchannel is branded as MyYTV.

In Bessemer, Pennsylvania, Comcast replaced Pittsburgh's WPCW with WYTV-DT2 in October despite the former becoming a CW affiliate. Armstrong Cable (one of the market's largest cable systems) carries the station on channel 13 replacing WUAB the MyNetworkTV affiliate in Cleveland. In addition, Comcast and Time Warner Cable systems in Ohio also carry the channel. Comcast carries this station on analog while Time Warner Cable shows it on their digital tier.

At its sign-on, it originally aired eighteen hours of original local programming each week and another 30½ hours of programming that was not original. The station carries taped high school football and basketball "Game of the Week" match-ups as well as tape delayed Youngstown State University football along with men's and women's basketball home games. It also aired Mahoning Valley Thunder arena football games and currently show select Mahoning Valley Scrappers baseball games.

For a period as a separate station, WYTV produced a prime time newscast at 10 on this MyNetworkTV second digital subchannel. This competed with another broadcast airing at the same time on Fox affiliate WYFX that is still produced today by WKBN. WYTV-DT2 currently repeats the main channel's weekday morning show from 7 until 9 that is known as 33 News at Daybreak. This broadcast features news anchor Len Rome (who is also a health reporter, "Good Question" segment producer, and feature reporter), weather caster Jim Loboy, and news reporter Greta Mittereder (who also produces the "Greta On The Go" segment).

An HD simulcast is also offered on WYFX-LD2 (Channel 62.2).

Programming

Children's programming
WYTV became known for its programming targeted to kids. WYTV aired cartoons and other kid-themed programming between the after school hours of 4:00 pm and 6:00 p.m. It once aired a kids' show during the 1980s entitled 33 Powwww which consisted of a "voice-activated" video game powered by the Mattel Intellivision. Viewers would call in to play this game and win prizes. Cartoons were also aired during the show. The TV POWWW concept was a syndicated franchise seen on television stations throughout the United States such as WCLQ in Cleveland (now WQHS-TV). WYTV also has produced the local quiz show YSU Academic Challenge in which high school and middle school students from all over the area answered questions for prizes.

Fox programming
During its affiliation pact with Fox, which lasted until low-power sister station WYFX signed on in 1998, WYTV preempted ABC programming whenever Fox programming aired.

Saving Private Ryan
WYTV was not among the ABC affiliates to preempt the Veterans Day airing of the film Saving Private Ryan in 2004 out of fears of being fined by the FCC for indecency in the wake of the Super Bowl XXXVIII halftime show controversy, feeling that the film aired unedited on terrestrial television in the past without FCC repercussions. Because WYTV did opt to air Saving Private Ryan, this gave viewers in the Columbus, Cleveland, and Pittsburgh television markets that were able to view WYTV either over-the-air or on cable television the option of watching the film, since Sinclair Broadcast Group, E. W. Scripps Company, and Hearst-Argyle Television (owners of WSYX, WEWS-TV, and WTAE-TV, respectively) did not allow any of their ABC affiliates to air the film. As Sinclair and Scripps each own additional ABC affiliates in the state, WYTV ultimately was one of only two ABC affiliates in the entire state of Ohio to air the film, alongside then-ABC owned-and-operated station WTVG. It was later determined that showing the movie was not a violation of FCC regulations.

News operation
For a period as a separate station, WYTV produced a prime time newscast at 10:00 p.m. on its MyNetworkTV second digital subchannel. This competed with another broadcast airing at the same time on Fox affiliate WYFX that was produced by WKBN.

In December 2007, the news departments of WYTV and WKBN physically merged. As a result, over 40 personnel at WYTV and six at WKBN were laid-off. Under the shared services agreement, the senior station partner began producing newscasts on this ABC affiliate from a secondary set at the Sunset Boulevard studios. A previous plan calling for WYTV to build streetside satellite studios in downtown Youngstown was abandoned due to the consolidation. The current operational status of its Doppler weather radar based at the old facility on Shady Run Road is unknown. The two stations gradually had their on-air looks mirror each other while their respective websites became identical. New logos for the stations and updated websites debuted in January 2009 including combined operations for sports and weather.

Due to the duopoly, WYTV and WKBN maintain separate primary anchors for news, weather, and sports during the week but share most general assignment reporters and video footage. The two initially maintained separate websites as well; however, after LIN Media took over ownership of WKBN/WYFX and operations of WYTV, WYTV's website became a redirect to WKBN's website with only WYTV's station identification information available on WKBN's site.

On May 6, 2010, the two outlets upgraded their combined news operation to high definition complete with new graphics on WYTV. There are news and weather sharing partnerships with WKBN (570 AM), WNIO (1390 AM), WNCD (93.3 FM), WAKZ (95.9 FM), WMXY (98.9 FM), and WBBG (106.1 FM).

In November 2013, WYTV along with WKBN debuted a branded tool for showing live broadcasts from a moving vehicle. "33 Live Drive Action Cam" is a Jeep Patriot that can chase storms, show road conditions and respond to breaking news.

Also in November 2013, WYTV began separating its content from that of WKBN and WYFX. This included WYTV receiving its own website once again.

Subchannels
The station's digital signal is multiplexed:

References

External links
 

Television channels and stations established in 1953
YTV
ABC network affiliates
1953 establishments in Ohio
Nexstar Media Group